ABS Free Dish was a Bermuda-based free-to-air digital direct-broadcast satellite television service owned and operated by ABS. Initially, ABS-2 satellite at 75° was used to broadcast 97 FTA MPEG-2 channels and one MPEG4 channel. In India, it was headed by Mr. Rajiv Khattar. 
It closed down its service in India in 2018.

History 
ABS operates a fleet of five satellites; ABS-2, ABS-2A, ABS-3A, ABS-4/Mobisat-1 and ABS-6. The satellite fleet covers 93 per cent of the world’s population across the Americas, Africa, Asia Pacific, Europe, the Middle East, CIS and Russia.

Headquartered in Bermuda, ABS has offices in the United States, UAE and Asia.

See also 
 Direct-to-home television in India

References

External links
 Channel list of ABS2 Free Dish on Lyngsat website
Channel list of ABS2 Free Dish on Flysat website
ABS Freedish updates on blog

Direct broadcast satellite services
Free-to-air
2012 establishments in Bermuda